Prince Albert was a constituency of the Legislative Assembly of Saskatchewan.

History 
In 1991, the district became part of Prince Albert Carlton.

Geography 
The district was based in Prince Albert, Saskatchewan.

Representation 

 21st Saskatchewan Legislature - Myron Kowalsky

References 

Former provincial electoral districts of Saskatchewan